Les "Salty" Parish (28 September 1955 – 12 February 1998) was an Australian rules footballer who played with Fitzroy and Melbourne in the Victorian Football League (VFL).

Parish originally played with Yarrawonga, then played with Tungamah in the Tungamah Football League, where he won the league's 1976 best and fairest award, the Lawless Medal, won the goal kicking award, with 105 goals and was a member of Tungamah’s premiership team, kicking four goals in the grand final. 

Parish then returneded to the Ovens and Murray Football League and played with Yarrawonga, winning their club best and fairest in 1977, 1978 and 1979. Parish originally trialed at North Melbourne, before being signed by Fitzroy Football Club in 1980. 

A ruck-rover and utility, he gave Fitzroy good service over six seasons. He kicked 21 goals in 1981, two of them in an elimination final win over Essendon. Parish also played finals football in 1983, when he did not miss a game all year, and again in 1984. He was Fitzroy's third best vote getter at the 1982 Brownlow Medal count and equal second in 1983. He finished his VFL career at Melbourne, after being transferred to Melbourne during the 1985 season due to salary cap restrictions.

Known for his many tattoos, he returned to playing at Yarrawonga in the Ovens & Murray Football League in 1986 upon leaving Melbourne and won  Yarrawonga's best and fairest in 1986 and 1987. Parish won the Ovens & Murray Football League's best and fairest award, the Morris Medal in 1986.

Parish coached Griffith Football Club from 1989 to 1991. He won the Riverina Football League’s best and fairest award, the Jim Quinn Medal in 1989 and they were runners up in 1991.

Parish then played with Cobram Football Club from 1992 to 1995, including their 1995 Murray Football League premiership. He also won there best and fairest award in 1993 and 1994.

He died of cancer in 1998.

Parish was inducted into the O&MFNL Hall of Fame in 2017.

References

1955 births
1998 deaths
Fitzroy Football Club players
Melbourne Football Club players
Yarrawonga Football Club players
Australian rules footballers from Victoria (Australia)

Links
 
 O&MFNL - Hall of Fame Inductees